= Rhys Bwtting =

15th-century Welsh harpist

Rhys Bwtting was a 15th cent. Welsh harpist. He was born and grew up in the Prestatyn area. He is known to have performed at the Eisteddfod held at Carmarthen in 1451, and won the prize as the best singer accompanying himself on the harp.
